Henderickx is a surname of Belgian origin. Notable people with the surname include:

Albert Henderickx (1900–1965), Belgian footballer
Hans Henderickx (1961–2016), Belgian entomologist
Philip Henderickx (born 1976), Belgian artist
Wim Henderickx (1962–2022), Belgian composer

See also
Hendrickx

Surnames of Belgian origin